Stuart Macrae or MacRae may refer to:

 Stuart Macrae (footballer) (1855–1927), English international footballer
 Stuart Macrae (inventor), British inventor
 Stuart MacRae (composer) (born 1976), British composer
 Stuart MacRae (ice hockey), Canadian ice hockey forward